was a Japanese sumo wrestler from Uto, Higo Province. He was the sport's 8th yokozuna, and is the only yokozuna in history to have been demoted.

Early life 
After his father's death he took over his position at age 15. He married early, at the age of 19, and had two sons. In 1823, he got into an argument with the head of his village. Forgetting his own strength, he pushed the village head too harshly. The village head fell to the floor and was knocked unconscious. Knowing the trouble this would cause him, he escaped from his hometown, leaving his family. He found refuge in Sakai, Osaka Prefecture and became the pupil of a wrestler named  who later bestowed his shikona, or ring name, to him.

Professional sumo career 
He entered Osaka-sumo and made his debut in May 1824 under the name  but changed his shikona multiple times. He didn't find much success in Osaka-sumo and transferred to Edo-sumo in November 1830 where he became the pupil of a wrestler named  and wrestled for the Unshu domain (雲州藩). In March, 1839 he began to wrestler for the Kumamoto Domain in Higo and was promoted to ōzeki under the name . He won only one tournament in February 1840 with an 8-0-2 record. He wasn't a particularly strong wrestler, but around the end of the Edo period the promotion in the ranking had less to do with ability and more to do with the influence of one's backers and Shiranui had powerful patrons. His promotion to ōzeki is also said to be because of the repeated failure of ōzeki (yokozuna) Inazuma to appear.

Yokozuna promotion
While being an ōzeki, he was given a yokozuna license. The actual date he was awarded the title is obscure, but the date is officially recognized as being in November 1840. His name was not written on the banzuke for the next tournament in January 1841 and he was absent from the November 1841 tournament for unknown reasons. At that time, yokozuna was not a rank but a title. He is the only former yokozuna to be demoted from the ōzeki rank. In the top makuuchi division, Shiranui won 48 bouts and lost 15 bouts, recording a winning percentage of 76.2.

Retirement from sumo
He retired from an active wrestler after the January 1844 tournament. He stayed in sumo as an elder after his retirement, under the name , and served as chairman of Osaka-sumo. The name of the Shiranui yokozuna dohyō-iri (ring entering ceremony) came not from him, but from the 11th yokozuna Shiranui Kōemon, whom he trained. Shiranui died in August, 1854 at 52. His grave is located on the hillside where he was born, in his hometown of Uto, Kumamoto. The place in considered a designated historic site and it's customary for Shiranui-style yokozuna to perform an in-ring ceremony when the Japan Sumo Association tours in the province.

Top division record 
The actual time the tournaments were held during the year in this period often varied.

  
    
    
  
  
    
    
  
  
    
    
  
  
    
    
  
  
    
    
  
  
    
    
  
  
    
    
  
  
    
  

*Championships for the best record in a tournament were not recognized or awarded before the 1909 summer tournament and the above unofficial championships are historically conferred. For more information see yūshō.

See also 
Glossary of sumo terms
List of yokozuna
List of past sumo wrestlers

References

1801 births
1854 deaths
Japanese sumo wrestlers
Yokozuna
Sumo people from Kumamoto Prefecture
19th-century wrestlers